Jack Kidd may refer to:

 Jack Kidd (Scottish footballer) (1884–?), Scottish football inside forward
 Jack Kidd (Australian footballer) (1908–1960), Australian rules footballer
 Jack Kidd (New Zealand footballer), former association football player who represented New Zealand

See also 
 John Kidd (disambiguation)